Gonzalo Daniel Escobar (born 16 March 1997) is an Argentine professional footballer who plays as a left-back for UD Ibiza.

Career
On 24 August 2021, Escobar joined newly-promoted Segunda División side Ibiza on a two-year deal.

References

External links

1997 births
Living people
Association football defenders
Argentine footballers
Argentine expatriate footballers
Club Atlético Temperley footballers
Club Atlético Colón footballers
UD Ibiza players
Argentine Primera División players
Segunda División players
Argentine expatriate sportspeople in Spain
Expatriate footballers in Spain
People from San Vicente Partido
Sportspeople from Buenos Aires Province